is a district of Katsushika, Tokyo, Japan.

Kanamachi is the residential district to the south of Kanamachi Station. Kanamachi in a broader sense may also include Higashikanamachi, to the north of the station.

Education
Katsushika City Board of Education operates area public elementary and junior high schools.

2-3 and 5-6 chome and the water plant, as well as parts of 1 and 4-chome, are zoned to Tokiwa Junior High School (常盤中学校). The rest of 1-chome and 4-chome are zoned to Niijuku Junior High School (新宿中学校).

References

Districts of Katsushika